Nessus may refer to:

Mythology 
 Nessus (mythology), a famous centaur from Greek mythology
 Nessus, an alternate name of Nestos (god), son of Oceanus and Tethys, and god of the river Nestos

Fiction 
 Nessus (Pierson's Puppeteer), an alien character in Larry Niven's Known Space books
 Nessus, a fictional metropolis in Gene Wolfe's The Book of the New Sun
 Nessus, a layer of Hell(Baator) in the Dungeons & Dragons tabletop game
 Nessus, one of the moons of the fictional planet Chiron in the computer game Sid Meier's Alpha Centauri
 Nessus, a planetoid location in the video game Destiny 2, based on the below Centaur

Science and technology 
 7066 Nessus, a Centaur planetoid
 Nessus (software), a computer security tool
 Nessus (Blackberry), the proprietary kernel all Blackberry before BlackBerry 10 were based upon
 NESSUS Probabilistic Analysis Software, a tool for assessing uncertainties in structural and mechanical systems
 Nessus sphinx or Amphion floridensis, a moth found in North America

Other uses 
 , two vessels of the Royal Navy (UK)